Amarjit may refer to 

 Amarjit Chandan, British-Punjabi writer
 Amarjit Chopra, Indian chartered accountant
 Amarjit Kaypee , Indian cricketer
 Amarjit Singh Dulat, Indian intelligence officer
 Amarjit Singh Kiyam, Indian footballer 
 Amarjit Singh Rana, Indian field hockey player
 Amarjit Singh Sahi, Indian politician
 Amarjit Singh Samra, Indian politician

Sikh names
Indian masculine given names